Réka Luca Jani (born 31 July 1991) is a Hungarian tennis player.

She has won 24 singles titles and 34 doubles titles on the ITF Women's World Tennis Tour. On 19 September 2022, she reached her best singles ranking of world No. 104. On 22 August 2016, she peaked at No. 124 in the doubles rankings. Her favorite surface is clay.

Playing for Hungary Billie Jean King Cup team, Jani has a win–loss record of 28–18.

Personal
Parents are Janos, Szilvia and Zsolt; brothers are Mate and Balint, sister is Petra.

Tennis career
Jani who began playing at age six, reached the first final on the WTA Tour in 2016, at the Brasil Tennis Cup partnering Tímea Babos.

She was awarded a wildcard entry to the 2016 Summer Olympics in Rio de Janeiro, along with Tímea Babos to play in women's doubles.

Jani reached her first-ever WTA Tour quarterfinal at the 2021 Serbia Open defeating Anna Kalinskaya. As a result she returned to the top 200 in singles.

On 9 May 2022, she reached a new career-high in singles of world No. 129 after reaching the quarterfinals in Chiasso, Switzerland ($60k), the final of the $60k Zagreb (lost to Jule Niemeier), Croatia, and quarterfinals of the $60k Prague tournaments.

Jani made her Grand Slam main-draw debut at the 2011 US Open losing to wildcard Sloane Stephens in the first round. She didn't make it back into a major main draw until the 2022 French Open when she made it through the qualifying rounds as a lucky loser.

Performance timelines

Singles
Current after the 2023 Australian Open.

Doubles

WTA career finals

Doubles: 1 (runner-up)

WTA Challenger finals

Singles: 1 (runner-up)

Doubles: 3 (3 runner-ups)

ITF Circuit finals

Singles: 42 (25 titles, 17 runner–ups)

Doubles: 67 (34 titles, 33 runner-ups)

National representation

Fed Cup/Billie Jean King Cup
Jani made her debut for the Hungary Fed Cup team in 2010, while the team was competing in the Europe/Africa Zone Group I, when she was 18 years and 187 days old.

Singles: 21 (11–10)

Doubles: 19 (12–7)

Notes

References

External links

 
 
 

1991 births
Living people
People from Siófok
Hungarian female tennis players
Olympic tennis players of Hungary
Tennis players at the 2016 Summer Olympics
Sportspeople from Somogy County